Charles Hope, 1st Earl of Hopetoun, KT, PC (1681 – 26 February 1742) was a Scottish nobleman.

Early life
He was the son of John Hope of Hopetoun by a daughter of the 4th Earl of Haddington. His father, John Hope, purchased the barony of Niddry Castle from George Seton, 4th Earl of Winton around 1680. He also bought the neighbouring barony of Abercorn, with the office of heritable sheriff of the County of Linlithgow, from Sir Walter Seton.

His paternal grandfather was Sir James Hope of Hopetoun and paternal great-grandfather was Sir Thomas Hope, 1st Baronet of Craighall, Fife.

Peerage
In 1681, John Hope was shire commissioner for Linlithgow in the Parliament of Scotland. Traveling with the Duke of York, family tradition has that his father had secured a seat in a rescue boats but gave it up to the Duke of York. The tradition continues that in recognition of this act, Charles was created Earl of Hopetoun in the Peerage of Scotland by Queen Anne on 15 April 1703, shortly after reaching his majority.

Career
Charles Hope supported the union with England. He later served as a Scottish representative peer at Westminster, from 1722 until his death. Lord Hopetoun acted as Lord High Commissioner to the General Assembly of the Church of Scotland in 1723, and was Governor of the Bank of Scotland from 1740 until his death. He was created a Knight of the Thistle in 1738.

Around 1738/9 he bought the entire estate of Ormiston from John Cockburn of Ormiston who had ironically bankrupted himself due to the cost of agricultural improvements and building the "model village" of Ormiston in 1736.

Personal life
In 1699, Charles Hope married Lady Henrietta Johnstone, daughter of William Johnstone, 1st Marquess of Annandale and the former Sophia Fairholm (a daughter of John Fairholm of Craigiehall). Their children include:

 Lady Sophia Hope (1702–1761), who married, as his second wife, James Ogilvy, 5th Earl of Findlater, in 1723.
 John Hope, 2nd Earl of Hopetoun (1704–1781), who married Lady Anne Ogilvy, second daughter of James Ogilvy, 5th Earl of Findlater.
 Lady Henrietta Hope (1706–1745), who married, as his first wife, Francis Napier, 6th Lord Napier of Merchistoun, after 1729.
 Lady Margaret Hope (1708–1778), who married John Dundas of Duddingston in 1745.
 Charles Hope-Weir (1710–1791), who married Catherine Weir, daughter and heiress of Sir William Weir of Blackwood, Bt. After her death in 1743, he married Lady Anne Vane, a daughter of Henry Vane, 1st Earl of Darlington; he married thirdly to  Helen Dunbar, a daughter of George Dunbar of Leuchold.
 Lady Helen Hope (1711–1778), who married James Watson of Saughton, in 1737.
 Lady Christian Hope (1714–1799), who married Thomas Graham of Balgowan in 1743.
 Lady Charlotte Hope (1720–1788), who married the Thomas Erskine, Lord Erskine, eldest son and heir apparent of John Erskine, 6th Earl of Mar and Lady Margaret Hay (daughter of Thomas Hay, 7th Earl of Kinnoull), in 1741.

Lord Hopetoun died on 26 February 1742 and was succeeded in the earldom by his eldest son, John.

References

1681 births
1742 deaths
Earls of Hopetoun
Peers of Scotland created by Queen Anne
Scottish representative peers
Knights of the Thistle
Charles
Shire Commissioners to the Parliament of Scotland
Governors of the Bank of Scotland
Lords High Commissioner to the General Assembly of the Church of Scotland
Members of the Parliament of Scotland 1702–1707